Stoner film is a subgenre of comedy film that revolves around the recreational use of cannabis. Generally, cannabis use is one of the main themes and inspires much of the plot. They are often representative of cannabis culture.

"Stoner film" as a genre 

The series of movies from 1978 to 1985 starring Cheech & Chong are archetypal "stoner movies". Although not intended as a comedy, the historic propaganda film Reefer Madness (1936) has also become popular as a "stoner movie" because its anti-drug message is seen by some modern viewers as so over the top that the film amounts to self-parody. Other examples include Assassin of Youth (1937), Marihuana (1936) and She Shoulda Said No! a.k.a. The Devil's Weed (1949). Playing on such parody, a musical comedy remake set in 1936 (as the original film was), Reefer Madness, was released in 2005.

High Times magazine regularly sponsors the Stony Awards to celebrate stoner films and television. Many of these films do not fit the category of "stoner film" as a subgenre, but contain enough cannabis use to be deemed noteworthy by the periodical.

Common elements 
Many stoner movies have certain elements and themes in common. The template involves a protagonist or protagonists (often two friends in a variation of the buddy film) who have or are attempting to find marijuana and have some task to complete.  Often stoner films involve evading authority figures, sometimes law-enforcement agents, who are portrayed as comically inept, but also parents, co-workers, friends, and security guards, who disapprove of the protagonists' marijuana usage, usually out of a greater lack of acceptance of their lifestyle of leisure and innocence. Most serious moments are intended ironically, often to parody overwrought counterparts in mainstream cinema. The comic story arcs often approach or fall over the line into slapstick.

Notable stoner films 

Jewel Robbery (1932)
Reefer Madness (1936)
Easy Rider (1969)
Beyond the Valley of the Dolls (1970)
Fritz the Cat (1972)
The Nine Lives of Fritz the Cat (1974)
The Chicken Chronicles (1977)
Cheech & Chong's Up in Smoke (1978)
Rockers (1978)
Cheech & Chong's Next Movie (1980)
Cheech & Chong's Nice Dreams (1981)
Things Are Tough All Over (1982)
Fast Times at Ridgemont High (1982)Still Smokin' (1983)Les Frères Pétard (1986)Class of Nuke 'Em High (1986)Far Out Man (1990)London Kills Me (1991) Dazed and Confused (1993)The Stoned Age (1994)PCU (1994)Friday (1995)Bio-Dome (1996)Don't Be a Menace to South Central While Drinking Your Juice in the Hood (1996)Bongwater (1997)Half Baked (1998)Around the Fire  (1998)Harvest (1998)Social Intercourse (1998)Homegrown (1998)Fear and Loathing in Las Vegas (1998)Dead Man on Campus (1998)Detroit Rock City (1999)Blowin' Smoke (1999)Human Traffic (1999)Outside Providence (1999)Dude, Where's My Car? (2000)Next Friday (2000)Saving Grace (2000)How High (2001)Wet Hot American Summer (2001)Lammbock (2001)Jay and Silent Bob Strike Back (2001)The Wash (2001)Scary Movie 2 (2001)Super Troopers (2001)Ali G Indahouse (2002)Friday After Next (2002)Slackers (2002)My Dinner with Jimi (2003)High Times' Potluck  (2002) Rolling Kansas (2003)Harold & Kumar Go to White Castle (2004)Soul Plane (2004)Without A Paddle (2004)Reefer Madness (2005 musical comedy remake)Clerks II (2006)
The Evil Bong series (2006–2018)Grandma's Boy (2006)Trailer Park Boys: The Movie (2006)Smiley Face (2007)Kush (2007) Walk Hard: The Dewey Cox Story (2007)Weirdsville (2007)Remember the Daze  (2007)Knocked Up (2007)Super High Me (documentary) (2007)Harold & Kumar Escape from Guantanamo Bay (2008)Pineapple Express (2008)Strange Wilderness (2008)The Wackness (2008)Humboldt County (2008)Stone Bros. (2009)The Cops Did It (2009) Stan Helsing (2009)Extract (2009)High Society: A Pot Boiler (2009) Van Wilder: Freshman Year (2009)Trailer Park Boys: Countdown to Liquor Day (2009)Due Date (2010)High School (2010)Eat Me! (2009)Leaves of Grass (2010)Anuvahood (2011)A Very Harold & Kumar Christmas (2011)Stonerville (2011)Paul (2011)Our Idiot Brother (2011)High Road (2011)Jeff, Who Lives at Home  (2011)Ted (2012)Liberal Arts (2012)The Newest Pledge  (2012) Mac & Devin Go to High School (2012)Easy Rider: The Ride Back (2012)Kili Poyi (2013)Hansel & Gretel Get Baked (2013)Idukki Gold (2013)Honey Bee (2013)Cheech & Chong's Animated Movie (2013)This Is the End (2013)Go Goa Gone (2013)Gingerdead Man vs. Evil Bong (2013)The Coed and the Zombie Stoner  (2014)Awkward Thanksgiving  (2014)Trailer Park Boys: Don't Legalize It (2014)Kid Cannabis (2014)Ted 2 (2015)American Ultra (2015)The Night Before  (2015)Midnight Delight  (2016)Jil Jung Juk (2016)Sausage Party (2016)Asockalypse!  (2016)Grow House (2017)Ripped (2017)Dude (2018)Super Troopers 2 (2018)The Beach Bum (2019)How High 2 (2019)Waldo on Weed (2019)The Marijuana Conspiracy (2020)Good Mourning (2022)

Stoner crossover filmsThe Harder They Come (1972), stoner crime filmThe Big Lebowski (1998), stoner crime comedy filmDeuce Bigalow: European Gigolo (2005), stoner sex comedyPuff, Puff, Pass (2006), stoner crime filmThe Tripper (2006), stoner slasher filmSex Pot (2009), stoner sex comedyMr. Nice (2010), stoner crime filmYour Highness (2011), stoner comic fantasyBong of the Dead (2011), horror stoner filmPaulette (2012), stoner crime filmSavages (2012), stoner crime filmWe're the Millers (2013), stoner crime filmInherent Vice (2014), stoner crime filmHalloweed (2016), horror stoner film

 Notable stoner television shows That '70s Show (1998–2006)Trailer Park Boys (2001–2007, 2014–)Weeds (2005–2012)Workaholics (2011–2017)High Maintenance (2012–)Broad City (2014–2019)Traveling the Stars: Action Bronson and Friends Watch Ancient Aliens (2016–)Disjointed (2017–2018)Solar Opposites (2020-)

 Notable stoner documentaries Grass: History of Marijuana'' (1999)

See also

Cannabis culture
List of drug films
Psychedelic film

== References ==

Film genres